Maternity is a 1917 American silent drama film directed by John B. O'Brien and starring Alice Brady, Marie Chambers and John Bowers. It was shot at Fort Lee studios in New Jersey.

Cast
 Alice Brady as Ellen Franklin 
 Marie Chambers as Louise Randall 
 John Bowers as David Gordon 
 David Powell as John Locke 
 Herbert Barrington as Henry Franklin 
 Florence Crane as Marion Franklin 
 Stanhope Wheatcroft as Dan Miller 
 Charles Duncan as Joseph Randall 
 Louis R. Grisel as Jed 
 Julia Stuart as Amelia 
 Madge Evans as Constance 
 John Dudley as Family Doctor

References

Bibliography
 Langman, Larry. American Film Cycles: The Silent Era. Greenwood Publishing, 1998.

External links
 

1917 films
1917 drama films
1910s English-language films
American silent feature films
Silent American drama films
American black-and-white films
World Film Company films
Films shot in Fort Lee, New Jersey
Films directed by John B. O'Brien
1910s American films